Virgil Sălișcan (born 26 May 1984 in Ploiești) is a Romanian foil fencer.

Saliscan is a member of CSA Steaua in Bucharest and is coached by Molea Romica. He earned a bronze medal at the 2002 Junior European Championships in Conegliano and reached a quarter-final at the 2003 Junior World Championships in Trapani. That same season, he began fencing in the senior category. He qualified for the 2008 Summer Olympics in Beijing by earning a bronze medal in the qualifying tournament in Lisbon. where he competed in the individual foil event. He lost the first preliminary match to Great Britain's Richard Kruse, with a score of 6–15.

Sălișcan retired from competition after the 2012–13 season and became a coach at CSA Steaua.

References

External links
 Profile at the European Fencing Confederation
 NBC 2008 Olympics profile

Romanian male fencers
Romanian foil fencers
Living people
Olympic fencers of Romania
Fencers at the 2008 Summer Olympics
Sportspeople from Ploiești
1984 births